Tatle may refer to:
 Tatl, a character from The Legend of Zelda
 to tattle, to gossip
 a tattle, a tattler or tattletale

See also
 Tatler (disambiguation)